The Women's individual normal hill competition at the FIS Nordic World Ski Championships 2019 was held on 27 February 2019. A qualification was held prior to the competition round.

Results

Qualification
The qualification was started at 15:00.

Final
The first round was started at 16:15 and the final round at 17:09.

References

Women's individual normal hill